List of museums in Karnataka, India.

See also
List of museums in India

References

 
Karnataka
Museums
Museums